Bernardo Rocha de Faria is a Brazilian Jiu-Jitsu competitor and instructor. He is five-time World Jiu-Jitsu Champion, European Champion, Pan-American Champion and Brazilian National Champion. 
In February and March 2013,  Faria was ranked first in the IBJJF World Ranking of all divisions, and was chosen as the best jiu jitsu athlete of 2015. Faria received his black belt from  instructor Ricardo Marques in 2008,  and moved to the Alliance Jiu Jitsu Sao Paulo team to train with mestre Fábio Gurgel in 2009. In June 2022 Faria was inducted in the IBJJF Hall of Fame.

Bernardo Faria currently runs his own Jiu Jitsu academy in Bedford, Massachusetts.  He is a member of Alliance Jiu Jitsu team and Marcelo Garcia Association.

On Faria's  YouTube channel,  "BJJ Fanatics", he regularly posts techniques alongside other Jiu Jitsu practitioners and MMA fighters such as Dean Lister, John Danaher and Gordon Ryan.

References

1987 births
Living people
Brazilian practitioners of Brazilian jiu-jitsu
People awarded a black belt in Brazilian jiu-jitsu
21st-century Brazilian people